Volodymyr Oleksandrovych Zelenskyy (also transliterated as Zelensky or Zelenskiy; born 25 January 1978) is a Ukrainian politician and former comedian and actor who has served as the sixth and current president of Ukraine since 2019.

Born to a Ukrainian Jewish family, Zelenskyy grew up as a native Russian speaker in Kryvyi Rih, a major city of Dnipropetrovsk Oblast in central Ukraine. Prior to his acting career, he obtained a degree in law from the Kyiv National Economic University. He then pursued a career in comedy and created the production company Kvartal 95, which produced films, cartoons, and TV shows including the TV series Servant of the People, in which Zelenskyy played the role of the Ukrainian president. The series aired from 2015 to 2019 and was immensely popular. A political party bearing the same name as the television show was created in March 2018 by employees of Kvartal 95.

Zelenskyy announced his candidacy in the 2019 presidential election on the evening of 31 December 2018, alongside the New Year's Eve address of then-president Petro Poroshenko on the TV channel 1+1. A political outsider, he had already become one of the frontrunners in opinion polls for the election. He has positioned himself as an anti-establishment and anti-corruption figure. As president, Zelenskyy has been a proponent of e-government and of unity between the Ukrainian and Russian speaking parts of the country's population. His communication style makes extensive use of social media, particularly Instagram. His party won a landslide victory in the snap legislative election held shortly after his inauguration as president. During the first two years of his administration, Zelenskyy oversaw the lifting of legal immunity for members of parliament (the Verkhovna Rada), the country's response to the COVID-19 pandemic and subsequent economic recession, and some limited progress in tackling corruption in Ukraine.

During his presidential campaign, Zelenskyy promised to end Ukraine's protracted conflict with Russia, and he has attempted to engage in dialogue with Russian president Vladimir Putin. His administration faced an escalation of tensions with Russia in 2021, culminating in the launch of an ongoing full-scale Russian invasion in February 2022. Zelenskyy's strategy during the Russian military buildup was to calm the Ukrainian populace and assure the international community that Ukraine was not seeking to retaliate. He initially distanced himself from warnings of an imminent war, while also calling for security guarantees and military support from NATO to "withstand" the threat. After the start of the invasion, Zelenskyy declared martial law across Ukraine and a general mobilisation of the armed forces. His leadership during the crisis has won him widespread international praise, and he has been described as a symbol of the Ukrainian resistance. Zelenskyy was named the Time Person of the Year for 2022, and opinion polls in Ukraine have ranked him as Ukraine's greatest president.

Early life 
Volodymyr Oleksandrovych Zelenskyy was born to Jewish parents on 25 January 1978 in Kryvyi Rih, then in the Ukrainian Soviet Socialist Republic. His father, Oleksandr Zelenskyy, is a professor and computer scientist and the head of the Department of Cybernetics and Computing Hardware at the Kryvyi Rih State University of Economics and Technology; his mother, Rymma Zelenska, used to work as an engineer. His grandfather, Semyon (Simon) Ivanovych Zelenskyy, served as an infantryman, reaching the rank of colonel in the Red Army (in the 57th Guards Motor Rifle Division) during World War II; Semyon's father and three brothers were killed in the Holocaust. In March 2022, Zelenskyy said that his great-grandparents had been killed after German troops burned their home to the ground during a massacre.

Before starting elementary school, Zelenskyy lived for four years in the Mongolian city of Erdenet, where his father worked. Zelenskyy grew up speaking Russian. At the age of 16 he passed the Test of English as a Foreign Language and received an education grant to study in Israel, but his father did not allow him to go. He later earned a law degree from the Kryvyi Rih Institute of Economics, then a department of Kyiv National Economic University and now part of Kryvyi Rih National University, but never worked in the legal field.

Entertainment career 
At age 17, he joined his local team competing in the KVN comedy competition. He was soon invited to join the united Ukrainian team "Zaporizhia-Kryvyi Rih-Transit", which performed in the KVN's Major League, and eventually won in 1997. That same year, he created and headed the Kvartal 95 team, which later transformed into the comedy outfit Kvartal 95. From 1998 to 2003, Kvartal 95 performed in the Major League and the highest open Ukrainian league of KVN, and the team members spent a lot of time in Moscow and constantly toured around post-Soviet countries. In 2003, Kvartal 95 started producing TV shows for the Ukrainian TV channel 1+1, and in 2005, the team moved to fellow Ukrainian TV channel Inter.

In 2008, he starred in the feature film Love in the Big City, and its sequel, Love in the Big City 2. Zelenskyy continued his movie career with the film Office Romance. Our Time in 2011 and with Rzhevsky Versus Napoleon in 2012. Love in the Big City 3 was released in January 2014. Zelenskyy also played the leading role in the 2012 film 8 First Dates and in sequels which were produced in 2015 and 2016. He recorded the voice of Paddington Bear in the Ukrainian dubbing of Paddington (2014) and Paddington 2 (2017).

Zelenskyy was a member of the board and the general producer of the TV channel Inter from 2010 to 2012.

In August 2014, Zelenskyy spoke out against the intention of the Ukrainian Ministry of Culture to ban Russian artists from Ukraine. Since 2015, Ukraine has banned Russian artists and other Russian works of culture from entering Ukraine. In 2018, the romantic comedy Love in the Big City 2 starring Zelenskyy was banned in Ukraine.

After the Ukrainian media had reported that during the Russo-Ukrainian War Zelenskyy's Kvartal 95 had donated ₴1 million to the Ukrainian army, some Russian politicians and artists petitioned for a ban on his works in Russia. Once again, Zelenskyy spoke out against the intention of the Ukrainian Ministry of Culture to ban Russian artists from Ukraine.

In 2015, Zelenskyy became the star of the television series Servant of the People, where he played the role of the president of Ukraine. In the series, Zelenskyy's character was a high-school history teacher in his 30s who won the presidential election after a viral video showed him ranting against government corruption in Ukraine.

The comedy series Svaty ("In-laws"), in which Zelenskyy appeared, was banned in Ukraine in 2017, but unbanned in March 2019.

Zelenskyy worked mostly in Russian-language productions. His first role in the Ukrainian language was the romantic comedy I, You, He, She, which appeared on the screens of Ukraine in December 2018. The first version of the script was written in Ukrainian but was translated into Russian for the Lithuanian actress Agnė Grudytė. Later, the movie was dubbed into Ukrainian.

In October 2021, the Pandora Papers revealed that Zelenskyy, his chief aide, and the head of the Security Service of Ukraine Ivan Bakanov operated a network of offshore companies in the British Virgin Islands, Cyprus, and Belize. These companies included some that owned expensive London property. Around the time of his 2019 election, Zelenskyy handed his shares in a key offshore company over to Sergei Shefir, but the two men appear to have made an arrangement for Zelenskyy's family to continue receiving the money from these companies. Zelenskyy's election campaign had centred on pledges to clean up the government of Ukraine.

2019 presidential campaign 

In March 2018, members of Zelenskyy's production company Kvartal 95 registered a new political party called Servant of the People – the same name as the television program that Zelenskyy had starred in over the previous three years. Although Zelenskyy denied any immediate plans to enter politics and said he had registered the party name only to prevent it being appropriated by others, there was widespread speculation that he was planning to run. As early as October 2018, three months before his campaign announcement and six months before the presidential election, he was already a frontrunner in opinion polls. After months of ambiguous statements, on 31 December, less than four months from the election, Zelenskyy announced his candidacy for president of Ukraine on the New Year's Eve evening show on the TV channel 1+1. His announcement up-staged the New Year's Eve address of incumbent president Petro Poroshenko on the same channel, which Zelenskyy said was unintentional and attributed to a technical glitch.

Zelenskyy's presidential campaign against Poroshenko was almost entirely virtual. He did not release a detailed policy platform and his engagement with mainstream media was minimal; he instead reached out to the electorate via social media channels and YouTube clips. In place of traditional campaign rallies, he conducted stand-up comedy routines across Ukraine with his production company Kvartal 95. He styled himself as an anti-establishment, anti-corruption figure, although he was not generally described as a populist. He said he wished to restore trust in politicians, "to bring professional, decent people to power" and to "change the mood and timbre of the political establishment". On 16 April 2019, a few days before the election, 20 Ukrainian news outlets called on Zelenskyy to "stop avoiding journalists". Zelenskyy stated that he was not hiding from journalists but that he did not want to go to talk shows where "people of the old power" were "just doing PR" and that he did not have time to satisfy all interview requests.

Prior to the elections, Zelenskyy presented a team that included former finance minister Oleksandr Danylyuk and others. During the campaign, concerns were raised over his links to the oligarch Ihor Kolomoyskyi, a billionaire businessman who had gained control of the 1+1 Media Group in 2010. The group operates eight Ukrainian TV channels and broadcast the Servant of the People TV series from 2015 until 2019, featuring Zelenskyy in a comedian role as a national president. 

President Poroshenko and his supporters claimed that Zelenskyy's victory would benefit Russia. On 19 April 2019 at Olimpiyskiy National Sports Complex presidential debates were held in the form of a show. In his introductory speech, Zelenskyy acknowledged that in 2014 he voted for Poroshenko, but "I was mistaken. We were mistaken. We voted for one Poroshenko, but received another. The first appears when there are video cameras, the other Petro sends Medvedchuk privietiki (greetings) to Moscow". Although Zelenskyy initially said he would only serve a single term, he walked back this promise in May 2021, saying he had not yet made up his mind.

Zelenskyy stated that as president he would develop the economy and attract investment to Ukraine through "a restart of the judicial system" and restoring confidence in the state. He also proposed a tax amnesty and a 5 per cent flat tax for big business which could be increased "in dialogue with them and if everyone agrees". According to Zelenskyy, if people would notice that his new government "works honestly from the first day", they would start paying their taxes.

Zelenskyy clearly won the first round of elections on 31 March 2019. In the second round, on 21 April 2019, he received 73 per cent of the vote to Poroshenko's 25 per cent, and was elected President of Ukraine. Polish president Andrzej Duda was one of the first European leaders to congratulate Zelenskyy. French president Emmanuel Macron received Zelenskyy at the Élysée Palace in Paris on 12 April 2019. On 22 April, U.S. president Donald Trump congratulated Zelenskyy on his victory over the telephone. European Commission president Jean Claude Juncker and European Council president Donald Tusk also issued a joint letter of congratulations and stated that the European Union (EU) will work to speed up the implementation of the remainder of the EU-Ukraine Association Agreement, including the Deep and Comprehensive Free Trade Area.

Presidency 

Zelenskyy was inaugurated on 20 May 2019. Various foreign officials attended the ceremony in Ukraine's parliament (Verkhovna Rada), including Salome Zourabichvili (Georgia), Kersti Kaljulaid (Estonia), Raimonds Vējonis (Latvia), Dalia Grybauskaitė (Lithuania), János Áder (Hungary), Maroš Šefčovič (European Union), and Rick Perry (United States). Zelenskyy is the first Jewish president; with Volodymyr Groysman as prime minister, Ukraine became the first country other than Israel to simultaneously have a Jewish head of state and head of government. In his inaugural address, Zelenskyy dissolved the then Ukrainian parliament and called for early parliamentary elections (which had originally been due to be held in October of that year). One of Zelenskyy's coalition partners, the People's Front, opposed the move and withdrew from the ruling coalition.

On 28 May, Zelenskyy restored the Ukrainian citizenship of Mikheil Saakashvili.

Zelenskyy's first major proposal to change the electoral system from a plurality voting system to proportional representation with closed party lists was strongly rejected by the Ukrainian parliament, due to the belief that closed lists would lead to more corruption in government.

In addition, on 6 June, lawmakers refused to include Zelenskyy's key initiative on reintroducing criminal liability for illegal enrichment in the parliament's agenda, and instead included a similar bill proposed by a group of deputies. In June 2019 it was announced that the president's third major initiative, which seeks to remove immunity from lawmakers, diplomats and judges, would be submitted after the July 2019 Ukrainian parliamentary election. This initiative was completed on 3 September, when the new parliament passed a bill stripping lawmakers of legal immunity, delivering Zelenskyy a legislative victory by fulfilling one of his key campaign promises.

On 8 July, Zelenskyy ordered the cancellation of the annual Kyiv Independence Day Parade on Maidan Nezalezhnosti, citing costs. Despite this, Zelenskyy highlighted that the day would "honor heroes" on Independence Day, however the "format will be new". He also proposed to spend the money that would have been used to finance the parade on veterans.

In 2020, Zelenskyy's party proposed reforms to Ukraine's media laws with the intent to increase competition and loosen the dominance of Ukrainian oligarchs on television and radio broadcasters. Critics said it risked increasing media censorship in Ukraine because its clause of criminal responsibility for the distribution of disinformation could be abused.

In January 2020, Zelenskyy took a trip to Oman that was not published on his official schedule, appearing to combine a personal holiday with government business. His office said Zelenskyy paid for the entire trip himself. Nevertheless he was criticised for a lack of transparency and critics pointed out he had once criticized his predecessor Poroshenko for taking an undisclosed vacation in the Maldives.

In January 2021, parliament passed a bill updating and reforming Ukraine's referendum laws, which Ukraine's Constitutional Court had declared unconstitutional in 2018. Fixing the referendum law had been one of Zelenskyy's campaign promises.

In June 2021, Zelenskyy submitted to the Verkhovna Rada a bill creating a public registry of Ukraine's oligarchs, banning them from participating in privatizations of state-owned companies, and forbidding them from contributing financially to politicians. Opposition party leaders supported Zelenskyy's goal of reducing oligarchs' influence on politics in Ukraine but were critical of his approach, saying the public register would be both dangerous, as it concentrated power in the president; and ineffective, since oligarchs were merely a "symbol" of more deeply-rooted corruption. The bill was passed into law in September 2021.
Critics of Zelenskyy's administration have claimed that, in taking power away from the Ukrainian oligarchs, he has sought to centralize authority and strengthen his personal position.

Cabinets and administration 
Zelenskyy appointed Andriy Bohdan as head of the Presidential Administration of Ukraine. Prior to this, Bohdan had been the lawyer of Ukrainian oligarch Ihor Kolomoyskyi. Under the rules of Lustration in Ukraine, introduced in 2014 following Euromaidan, Bohdan is not entitled to hold any state office until 2024 (because of his government post during the Second Azarov Government). Bohdan, however, contended that because heading the presidential administration is not considered civil service work, lustration did not apply to him. A number of the members of the Presidential Administration Zelenskyy appointed were former colleagues from his former production company, Kvartal 95, including Ivan Bakanov, who became deputy head of the Ukrainian Secret Service. Former deputy foreign minister Olena Zerkal declined an appointment as deputy head of the presidential administration, but did agree to serve as the Ukrainian representative of the international courts concerning Russia. Zelenskyy's requests to replace the foreign minister, defence minister, chief prosecutor and head of Ukraine's security service were rejected by parliament. Zelenskyy also dismissed and replaced 20 of the governors of Ukraine's 24 oblasts.

Honcharuk government 

In the 21 July 2019 parliamentary election, Zelenskyy's political party, Servant of the People, won the first single-party majority in modern Ukrainian history in parliament, with 43 per cent of the party-list vote. His party gained 254 of the 424 seats.

Following the elections, Zelenskyy nominated Oleksiy Honcharuk as prime minister, who was quickly confirmed by parliament. Parliament also confirmed Andrii Zahorodniuk as defence minister, Vadym Prystaiko as foreign minister and Ivan Bakanov as head of the SBU. Arsen Avakov, a controversial figure due to longstanding corruption allegations, was kept on as interior minister, with Honcharuk arguing that the relatively inexperienced government needed experienced administrators and that Avakov had been "'drawn red lines' that cannot be crossed."

Zelenskyy dismissed Bohdan as head of his presidential administration on 11 February 2020 and appointed Andriy Yermak as his successor the same day.

Shmyhal government 

In March 2020, Honchurak resigned as prime minister following the leak of an audio recording in which he appeared to belittle Zelenskyy's economic management. Honchurak was replaced as prime minister Denys Shmyhal. Honchurak's hasty departure caused disquiet both in Ukraine and abroad, with many economists and political observers warning it would bring instability. In his 4 March address to the Rada, Zelenskyy recommitted to reforms domestic and financial, and remarked that he "cannot always become a psychologist for people, a crisis manager for someone, a collector who requires honestly earned money, and a nanny of the ministry in charge." By September 2020, Zelenskyy's approval ratings had fallen to less than 32 per cent.

On 24 March 2021, Zelenskyy signed the Decree 117/2021 approving the "strategy for de-occupation and reintegration of the temporarily occupied territory of the Autonomous Republic of Crimea and the city of Sevastopol."

Attempts to end the Donbas conflict 
One of Zelenskyy's central campaign promises had been to end the Russo-Ukrainian War and resolve the Russia-sponsored separatist movement there. On 3 June, Zelenskyy appointed former president Leonid Kuchma as Ukraine's representative in the Tripartite Contact Group for a settlement in the conflict. On 11 July 2019, Zelenskyy held his first telephone conversation with Russian president Vladimir Putin, during which he urged Putin to enter into talks mediated by European countries. The two leaders also discussed the exchange of prisoners held by both sides. In October 2019, Zelenskyy announced a preliminary deal struck with the separatists, under which the Ukrainian government would respect elections held in the region in exchange for Russia withdrawing its unmarked troops. The deal was met with heavy criticism and protests by both politicians and the Ukrainian public. Detractors noted that elections held in Donbas were unlikely to be free and fair, that the separatists had long driven out most pro-Ukrainian residents out of the region to ensure a pro-Russia majority, and that it would be impossible to ensure Russia kept its end of the agreement. Zelenskyy defended his negotiations, saying the elections would not be held before a Russian withdrawal. The agreement failed to ease the conflict, as the separatists continued their attacks and Russia continued providing them with weapons and ammunition. Several Ukrainian nationalist militias and former militias also refused to accept the agreement, including the far-right Azov fighters in the Luhansk region of Donbas. Zelenskyy met personally with some of these groups and tried to convince them to surrender their unregistered weapons and accept the peace accord. Andriy Biletsky, the leader of the far-right National Corps and first commander of Azov, accused Zelenskyy of being disrespectful to army veterans and of acting on behalf of the Kremlin by leaving Ukrainians vulnerable to Russian aggression. Ultimately, the peace deal failed to reduce the violence, much less end the war.

In December 2019, Russia and Ukraine agreed to resume talks mediated by France and Germany under the so-called Normandy Format, which had been abandoned in 2016; it was Zelenskyy's first face-to-face meeting with Vladimir Putin. In July 2020, Zelenskyy announced a formal ceasefire with the separatists — the more than twentieth such attempt since the war began in 2014. Although the ceasefire was frequently violated over the next few years and overall violence remained high, ceasefire violations in 2020 did decrease by over 50 per cent compared to the previous year.

UIA Flight 752 

On 8 January 2020, the Presidential Office announced that Volodymyr Zelenskyy was cutting his trip to Oman short owing to the Ukraine International Airlines Flight 752 plane crash in nearby Iran the same day. The same day, internet news site Obozrevatel.com released information that on 7 January 2020, Ukrainian politician of the Opposition Platform — For Life Viktor Medvedchuk – who has exclusive relations with the current president of Russia – may have arrived in Oman. Soon, rumors began that Zelenskyy may have had some additional meetings beside the ones that were announced. On 14 January 2020, Andriy Yermak dismissed the rumors as speculations and baseless conspiracy theories, while Medvedchuk stated that the plane was used by his older daughter's family to fly from Oman to Moscow. Later, Yermak contacted the on-line newspaper Ukrainian Truth and gave more details about the visit to Oman and the plane crash in Iran.

On 17 January 2020, the presidential appointee Minister of Foreign Affairs Vadym Prystaiko was unable to give answers during the "times of questions to the government" in parliament when the people's deputies of Ukraine asked him about the visit's official agenda, the invitation from Oman, officials of the Ministry of Foreign Affairs who were preparing the visit, as well as how the president actually crossed the border while visiting Oman. On 20 January 2020, Prystaiko followed up by giving a briefing to the press in the Office of the president of Ukraine and saying that he would explain everything about the visit that when the time came.

Foreign relations 

Zelenskyy's first official trip abroad as president was to Brussels in June 2019, where he met with European Union and NATO officials.

In August 2019, Zelenskyy promised to lift the moratorium on exhuming Polish mass graves in Ukraine after the previous Ukrainian government banned the Polish side from carrying out any exhumations of Polish victims of the Ukrainian Insurgent Army-perpetrated Volhynian massacres, following the removal of a memorial to the Ukrainian Insurgent Army in Hruszowice, southeastern Poland.

In September 2019, it was reported that U.S. president Donald Trump had allegedly blocked payment of a congressionally mandated $400 million military aid package to Ukraine to pressure Zelenskyy during a July phone call between the two presidents to investigate alleged wrongdoing by Joe Biden and his son Hunter Biden, who took a board seat on Ukrainian natural gas company Burisma Holdings. This report was the catalyst for the Trump–Ukraine scandal and the impeachment inquiry against Donald Trump. Zelenskyy has denied that he was pressured by Trump and declared that "he does not want to interfere in a foreign election."

On a trip to the United States in September 2021, Zelenskyy engaged in talks and commitments with U.S. president Joe Biden, Secretary of Defense Lloyd Austin, Secretary of Energy Jennifer Granholm, and Secretary of State Antony Blinken. President Zelenskyy and First Lady Olena Zelenska also took part in the opening of the Ukrainian House in Washington, D.C. On the same trip, he met with Apple CEO Tim Cook and with Ukrainians in senior positions at Silicon Valley tech companies and spoke at Stanford University. While Zelenskyy was still in the U.S., just after delivering a speech at the United Nations, an assassination attempt was made in Ukraine on Serhiy Shefir, his closest aide. Shefir was unhurt in the attack, although his driver was hospitalized with three bullet wounds.

2021–2022 Russo-Ukrainian crisis 

In April 2021, in response to Russian military build-up at the Ukrainian borders, Zelenskyy spoke to American president Joe Biden and urged NATO members to speed up Ukraine's request for membership.

On 26 November 2021, Zelenskyy accused Russia and Ukrainian oligarch Rinat Akhmetov of backing a plan to overthrow his government. Russia denied any involvement in a coup plot and Akhmetov said in a statement that "the information made public by Volodymyr Zelenskiy about attempts to draw me into some kind of coup is an absolute lie. I am outraged by the spread of this lie, no matter what the president's motives are." In December 2021, Zelenskyy called for preemptive action against Russia.

On 19 January 2022, Zelenskyy said in a video message that the country's citizens should not panic and appealed to the media to be "methods of mass information and not mass hysteria." On 28 January, Zelenskyy called on the West not to create a "panic" in his country over a potential Russian invasion, adding that constant warnings of an "imminent" threat of invasion are putting the economy of Ukraine at risk. Zelenskyy said that "we do not see a bigger escalation" than in early 2021 when Russia's military build-up started. Zelenskyy and U.S. president Joe Biden disagreed on how imminent the threat was.

On 19 February, as worries of a Russian invasion of Ukraine grew, Zelenskyy warned the Munich Security Conference that Western nations should abandon their "appeasement" attitude toward Moscow. "Ukraine has been granted security assurances in exchange for giving up the world's third-largest nuclear arsenal. We don't have any firearms. And there's no security... But we have a right to urge a transformation from an appeasement policy to one that ensures security and peace," he stated.

In the early hours of 24 February, shortly before the start of the Russian invasion, Zelenskyy recorded an address to the citizens of both Ukraine and Russia. He disputed claims of the Russian government about the presence of neo-Nazis in the Ukrainian government and stated that he had no intention of attacking the Donbas region, while highlighting his personal connections to the area. In part of the address, he spoke in Russian to the people of Russia, appealing to them to pressure their leadership to prevent war:

The speech was widely described as "emotional" and "astonishing".

2022 Russian invasion of Ukraine

First phase: Invasion of Ukraine (24 February – 7 April)
On the morning of 24 February, Putin announced that Russia was initiating a "special military operation" in the Donbas. Russian missiles struck a number of military targets in Ukraine, and Zelenskyy declared martial law. Zelenskyy also announced that diplomatic relations with Russia were being severed, effective immediately. Later in the day, he announced general mobilisation. On 25 February, Zelenskyy said that despite Russia's claim that it was targeting only military sites, civilian sites were also being hit. In an early morning address that day, Zelenskyy said that his intelligence services had identified him as Russia's top target, but that he is staying in Kyiv and his family will remain in the country. "They want to destroy Ukraine politically by destroying the head of state", he said. In the early hours of 26 February, during the most significant assault by Russian troops on the capital of Kyiv, the United States government and Turkish president Recep Tayyip Erdoğan urged Zelenskyy to evacuate to a safer location, and both offered assistance for such an effort. Zelenskyy turned down both offers and opted to remain in Kyiv with its defense forces, saying that "the fight is here [in Kyiv]; I need ammunition, not a ride".

More than 90% of Ukrainians supported the actions of Zelenskyy, including more than 90% in western and central Ukraine and more than 80% in Russian-speaking regions in eastern and southern Ukraine. A Pew Research Center poll found that 72% of Americans had confidence in Zelenskyy's handling of international affairs.

Zelenskyy has gained worldwide recognition as the wartime leader of Ukraine during the Russian invasion; historian Andrew Roberts compared him to Winston Churchill. Harvard Political Review said that Zelenskyy "has harnessed the power of social media to become history's first truly online wartime leader, bypassing traditional gatekeepers as he uses the internet to reach out to the people." He has been described as a national hero or a "global hero" by many commentators, including publications such as The Hill, Deutsche Welle, Der Spiegel and USA Today. BBC News and The Guardian have reported that his response to the invasion has received praise even from previous critics. During the invasion, Zelenskyy has been reportedly the target of more than a dozen assassination attempts; three were prevented due to tips from Russian FSB employees who opposed the invasion. Two of those attempts were carried out by the Wagner Group, a Russian paramilitary force, and the third by the Kadyrovites, the personal guard of Chechen leader Ramzan Kadyrov. While speaking about Ukrainian civilians who were killed by Russian forces, Zelenskyy said:
 On 7 March 2022, Czech president Miloš Zeman decided to award Zelenskyy with the highest state award of the Czech Republic, the Order of the White Lion, for "his bravery and courage in the face of Russia's invasion".

Zelenskyy has repeatedly called for direct talks with Russian president Vladimir Putin, saying: "Good Lord, what do you want? Leave our land. If you don't want to leave now, sit down with me at the negotiating table. But not from 30 meters away, like with Macron and Scholz. I don't bite." Zelenskyy said he was "99.9 percent sure" that Putin thought the Ukrainians would welcome the invading forces with "flowers and smiles".

On 7 March 2022, as a condition for ending the invasion, the Kremlin demanded Ukraine's neutrality; recognition of Crimea, which had been annexed by Russia, as Russian territory; and recognition of the self-proclaimed separatist republics of Donetsk and Luhansk as independent states. On 8 March, Zelenskyy expressed willingness to discuss Putin's demands. Zelenskyy said he is ready for dialogue, but "not for capitulation". He proposed a new collective security agreement for Ukraine with the United States, Turkey, France, Germany as an alternative to the country joining NATO. Zelenskyy's Servant of the People party said that Ukraine would not give up its claims on Crimea, Donetsk and Luhansk. However, Zelenskyy said that Ukraine was considering giving the Russian language protected minority status.

On 15 March 2022, Polish Prime Minister Mateusz Morawiecki, together with Czech Prime Minister Petr Fiala and Slovenian Prime Minister Janez Janša, visited Kyiv to meet with Zelenskyy in a display of support for Ukraine. On 16 March 2022, a deepfake appeared online of Zelenskyy calling on Ukrainian citizens to surrender to Russia. The attack was largely deemed to have failed at its intended goal. The video is considered to be the first use of deepfake technology in a global-scale disinformation attack.

Zelenskyy has made an effort to rally the governments of Western nations in an effort to isolate Russia. He has made numerous addresses to the legislatures of the EU, UK, Poland, Australia, Canada, US, Germany, Israel, Italy, Japan, the Netherlands, Romania, and the Nordic countries.

On March 23, Zelenskyy was calling on Russians to emigrate from Russia so as not to finance the war in Ukraine with their taxes. In March 2022, Zelenskyy supported the suspension of 11 Ukrainian political parties with ties to Russia: the Socialist Party of Ukraine, Derzhava, Left Opposition, Nashi, Opposition Bloc, Opposition Platform — For Life, Party of Shariy, Progressive Socialist Party of Ukraine, Union of Leftists, and the Volodymyr Saldo Bloc. The Communist Party of Ukraine, another pro-Russia party, had already been banned in 2015 because of its support to the Donbas separatists. Zelenskyy has also supported consolidating all TV news stations into a single 24-hour news broadcast run by the state of Ukraine.

Second phase: South-Eastern front (8 April – 5 September)

In April 2022, Zelenskyy criticized Germany's ties with Russia. In May 2022, Zelenskyy said that Ukrainian men of conscription age had a duty to remain in Ukraine and that up to 100 Ukrainian soldiers were killed every day in the fighting in eastern Ukraine. He made the comment after he was asked about an online petition calling to lift a prohibition on Ukrainian men leaving Ukraine. As Zelenskyy ordered a general military mobilization in February 2022, he also banned men aged 18 to 60 from leaving Ukraine. In early June 2022, Zelenskyy's adviser Mykhailo Podolyak said that up to 200 Ukrainian soldiers were killed in combat every day.

Zelenskyy denounced suggestions by former US diplomat Henry Kissinger that Ukraine should cede control of Crimea and Donbas to Russia in exchange for peace. On 25 May 2022, he said that Ukraine would not agree to peace until Russia agreed to return Crimea and the Donbas region to Ukraine. However, he later said he did not believe that all the land seized by Russia since 2014, which includes Crimea, could be recaptured by force, saying that "If we decide to go that way, we will lose hundreds of thousands of people."

On 3 May 2022, Zelenskyy accused Turkey of having "double standards" by welcoming Russian tourists while attempting to act as an intermediary between Russia and Ukraine in order to end the war. On 25 May 2022, Zelenskyy said that he was satisfied with China's policy of staying away from the conflict. In August 2022, he said China had the economic leverage to pressure Putin to end the war, adding "I’m sure that without the Chinese market for the Russian Federation, Russia would be feeling complete economic isolation. That’s something that China can do – to limit the trade [with Russia] until the war is over." According to Zelenskyy, since the beginning of the invasion, Chinese President Xi Jinping had refused to speak with him."

On 30 May 2022, Zelenskyy criticized EU leaders for being too soft on Russia and asked, "Why can Russia still earn almost a billion euros a day by selling energy?" The study published by the Centre for Research on Energy and Clean Air (CREA) calculates that the EU paid Russia about €56 billion for fossil fuel deliveries in the three months following the start of Russia's invasion.

On 20 June 2022, Zelenskyy addressed African Union (AU) representatives via videoconference. He invited African leaders for virtual meeting but only four of them attended. On 20 July 2022, South America's Mercosur trade bloc refused Zelenskyy's request to speak at the trade bloc's summit in Paraguay.

Third phase: Counteroffensives and annexations (6 September – present)

Speaking about the 2022 Russian mobilization, Zelenskyy called on Russians to not submit to "criminal mobilization", saying: "Russian commanders do not care about the lives of Russians — they just need to replenish the empty spaces left" by killed and wounded Russian soldiers. Following Putin's announcement of Russia annexing four regions of Ukrainian territory it had seized during its invasion, Zelenskyy announced that Ukraine would not hold peace talks with Russia while Putin was president.

On 25 September 2022, Zelenskyy said that Putin’s threats to use nuclear weapons "could be a reality." He added that Putin "wants to scare the whole world" with nuclear blackmail. He also said that Putin is aware that the "world will never forgive" a Russian nuclear strike.  When asked what kind of relationship Ukrainians and Ukraine will have with Russia after the war, Zelenskyy replied that "They took too many people, too many lives. The society will not forgive them", adding that "It will be the choice of our society whether to talk to them, or not to talk at all, and for how many years, tens of years or more." On 21 December 2022, Zelenskyy visited the United States on his first foreign trip since the war began. He met with President Joe Biden and addressed Congress delivering his full speech in English. The United States announced they would supply Patriot missiles to Ukraine as had been requested.

Political views

Economic issues 
In a mid-June interview with  a representative of the president of Ukraine at the Cabinet of Ministers, Andriy Herus stated that Zelenskyy had never promised to lower communal tariffs, but that a campaign video in which Zelenskyy stated that the price of natural gas in Ukraine could fall by 20–30 per cent or maybe more was a not a direct promise but actually "half-hinting" and "joking". Zelenskyy's election manifesto mentioned tariffs only once—that money raised from a capital amnesty would go towards "lowering the tariff burden on low-income citizens".

Foreign policy 

During his presidential campaign, Zelenskyy said that he supported Ukraine's becoming a member of the European Union and NATO, but he said Ukrainian voters should decide on the country's membership of these two organisations in referendums. At the same time, he believed that the Ukrainian people had already chosen "eurointegration". Zelenskyy's close advisor Ivan Bakanov also said that Zelenskyy's policy is supportive of membership of both the EU and NATO, and proposes holding referendums on membership. Zelenskyy's electoral programme claimed that Ukrainian NATO membership is "the choice of the Maidan and the course that is enshrined in the Constitution, in addition, it is an instrument for strengthening our defense capability". The program states that Ukraine should set the goal to apply for a NATO Membership Action Plan in 2024. The programme also states that Zelenskyy "will do everything to ensure" that Ukraine can apply for European Union membership in 2024. Two days before the second round, Zelenskyy stated that he wanted to build "a strong, powerful, free Ukraine, which is not the younger sister of Russia, which is not a corrupt partner of Europe, but our independent Ukraine".

In October 2020, he spoke in support of Azerbaijan in regards to the Nagorno-Karabakh war between Azerbaijan and ethnic Armenians over the disputed region of Nagorno-Karabakh. Zelenskyy said: "We support Azerbaijan's territorial integrity and sovereignty just as Azerbaijan always supports our territorial integrity and sovereignty."

In February 2022, he applied for Ukraine to join the European Union.

Zelenskyy has tried to position Ukraine as a neutral party in the political and trade tensions between the United States and China. In January 2021, Zelenskyy said in an interview with Axios that he does not perceive China as a geopolitical threat and that he does not agree with the United States assertions that it represents one.

Russo-Ukrainian War 

Zelenskyy supported the late 2013 and early 2014 Euromaidan movement. During the war in Donbas, he actively supported the Ukrainian army. Zelenskyy helped fund a volunteer battalion fighting on Donbas.

In a 2014 interview with Komsomolskaya Pravda in Ukraine, Zelenskyy said that he would have liked to pay a visit to Crimea, but would avoid it because "armed people are there". In August 2014, Zelenskyy performed for Ukrainian troops in Mariupol and later his studio donated ₴1 million to the Ukrainian army. Regarding the 2014 Russian annexation of Crimea, Zelenskyy said that, speaking realistically, it would be possible to return Crimea to Ukrainian control only after a regime change in Russia.

In an interview in December 2018, Zelenskyy stated that as president he would try to end the ongoing war in Donbas by negotiating with Russia. As he considered the leaders of the Donetsk People's Republic and the Luhansk People's Republic (DPR and LPR) to be Russia's "puppets", it would "make no sense to speak with them". He did not rule out holding a referendum on the issue. In an interview published three days before the 2019 presidential election (on 21 April), Zelenskyy stated that he was against granting the Donbas region "special status". In the interview he also said that if he were elected president he would not sign a law on amnesty for the militants of the DPR and LPR.

In response to suggestions to the contrary, he stated in April 2019 that he regarded Russian president Vladimir Putin "as an enemy". On 2 May 2019, Zelenskyy wrote on Facebook that "the border is the only thing Russia and Ukraine have in common".

Zelenskyy opposes the Nord Stream 2 natural gas pipeline between Russia and Germany, calling it "a dangerous weapon, not only for Ukraine but for the whole of Europe."

On 25 May 2022, Zelenskyy said that "Ukraine will fight until it regains all its territories."

Government reform 

During the presidential campaign, Zelenskyy promised bills to fight corruption, including removal of immunity from the president of the country, members of the Verkhovna Rada (the Ukrainian parliament) and judges, a law about impeachment, reform of election laws, and providing efficient trial by jury. He promised to bring the salary for military personnel "to the level of NATO standards".

Although Zelenskyy prefers elections with open list election ballots, after he called the snap 2019 Ukrainian parliamentary election his draft law "On amendments to some laws of Ukraine in connection with the change of the electoral system for the election of people's deputies" proposed to hold the election with closed list because the 60-day term to the snap election did not "leave any chances for the introduction of this system".

Social issues 

Zelenskyy opposed targeting the Russian language in Ukraine and banning artists for their political opinions (such as those viewed by the Government as anti-Ukrainian). In April 2019, he stated that he was not against a Ukrainian language quota (on radio and TV), although he noted they could be tweaked. He also said that Russian artists "who have turned into (anti-Ukrainian) politicians" should remain banned from entering Ukraine.

In responding to a petition demanding equal rights for same-sex couples, Zelenskyy echoed the view that family does not depend on sex and asked the Prime Minister of Ukraine to review civil partnerships for same-sex couples. With regards to same-sex marriage, Zelenskyy cited a provision in the Constitution of Ukraine barring same-sex marriage, as well as a ban on wartime changes to the Constitution, ruling out an introduction of same-sex marriages during the ongoing war. Civil rights organizations praised the statement, though criticizing its vagueness, as Zelenskyy eschewed details about legal proposals for civil partnerships.

On 2 December 2022, Zelenskyy entered a bill to the Verkhovna Rada that would officially ban all activities of the Ukrainian Orthodox Church (Moscow Patriarchate) UOC in Ukraine.

Personal life 

In September 2003, Zelenskyy married Olena Kiyashko, with whom he had attended school and university. Kiyashko worked as a scriptwriter at Kvartal 95. The couple's first daughter, Oleksandra, was born in July 2004. Their son, Kyrylo, was born in January 2013. In Zelenskyy's 2014 movie 8 New Dates, their daughter played Sasha, the daughter of the protagonist. In 2016, she participated in the show The Comedy Comet Company Comedy's Kids and won ₴50,000. The family lives in Kyiv.

Zelenskyy's first language is Russian, and he is also fluent in Ukrainian and English. His assets were worth about ₴37 million (about US$1.5 million) in 2018.

Achievements, awards and recognition

Awards and decorations
On 27 March 2022, Slovakia awarded Zelenskyy one of the country's top awards, the State Award of Alexander Dubček. Eduard Heger, the Slovak prime minister, compared the Russian invasion of Ukraine in 2022 to the Soviet invasion of Czechoslovakia in 1968. British newspaper Financial Times selected Zelenskyy as Person of the Year in 2022.

: Honorary Diploma of the Cabinet of Ministers of Ukraine (2003)
:  Order of the White Lion, First Class (2022)
:  Grand Cross of the Order of the Legion of Honour (2023)
: Charlemagne Prize (2023)
:  Commander of Grand Cross of the Order of Viesturs (2022)
:  Order of Vytautas the Great with the Golden Chain (2022)
: Jan Karski Eagle Award (2022)
: State Award of Alexander Dubček (2022)
: Sir Winston Churchill Leadership Award (2022)
:
Ronald Reagan Freedom Award (2022)
John F. Kennedy Profile in Courage Award (2022)
Philadelphia Liberty Medal (2022)
Ripple of Hope Award (2022)

Species named after Zelenskyy
Ausichicrinites zelenskyyi, an extinct species of feather star described on 20 July 2022 by a group of Polish paleontologists, is named after Zelenskyy "for his courage and bravery in defending free Ukraine".

Selected filmography

Films

Television shows and appearances

Book
A collection of sixteen of Zelenskyy's speeches as president have been collected in a book.

Notes

References

External links

 
 Kvartal 95 
 
 
 
 Who is Volodymyr Zelenskyy? 1:31h Biograph Fox Videos
 

 
1978 births
Anti-Russification activists
Living people
Mass media people from Kryvyi Rih
Kyiv National Economic University alumni
Ukrainian male comedians
Ukrainian television presenters
21st-century Ukrainian male actors
Ukrainian male film actors
Ukrainian male voice actors
Ukrainian Jews
Ukrainian screenwriters
Ukrainian film producers
Ukrainian parodists
Candidates in the 2019 Ukrainian presidential election
Servant of the People (political party) politicians
Ukrainian actor-politicians
Jewish presidents
Jewish male comedians
Jewish male actors
Male screenwriters
Jewish Ukrainian politicians
Jewish Ukrainian comedians
Jewish Ukrainian actors
Presidents of Ukraine
Trump–Ukraine scandal
People named in the Pandora Papers
Recipients of the Ronald Reagan Freedom Award
Grand Croix of the Légion d'honneur
Grand Crosses with Golden Chain of the Order of Vytautas the Great
Collars of the Order of the White Lion
Recipients of the Honorary Diploma of the Cabinet of Ministers of Ukraine
Time Person of the Year
Politicians from Kryvyi Rih
Military leaders of the 2022 Russo-Ukrainian War
Soviet expatriates in Mongolia